Sonny Tuigamala (born 17 June 1988) is an Australian Rugby league Player for the Sydney Roosters in the NRL.
He made his NRL debut in Round 3, 2009. He previously played for the Penrith Panthers Toyota Cup Team. Sonny Tuigamala has signed back with his junior club, the Penrith Panthers, for the 2011 season.

Early life
Sonny was educated at Chifley College Bidwill Campus and played his junior footy for St Mary's Saints in Western Sydney.

References 

1988 births
Living people
Australian rugby league players
Australian people of New Zealand descent
Australian sportspeople of Samoan descent
Rugby league wingers
Rugby league players from Sydney
Sydney Roosters players
Windsor Wolves players